Antoine Casimir Marguerite Eugène Foudras (19 November 1783, Lyon – 13 April 1859, Lyon) was a French entomologist. He was a Member of the Société Linnéenne de Lyon.

Although Eugène Foudras had to work hard to earn his living, he spent all his spare time collecting insects in various parts of France, especially Chamonix, Bresse, Dauphiné, Lyonnais and Maconnais. Having sold his insect cabinet in 1837, he was able to devote himself entirely to entomology. He specialized in ”Altisides", small Coleoptera. Many species in this group are major agricultural pest. The majority of Foudras' works remain in manuscript. His later collections were bequeathed to the Lycée du Parc in Lyon.

Publications
 1827 – Rapport à la Société royale d'agriculture... de Lyon, sur un concours ouvert pour la destruction de la pyrale de la vigne
 1829 – Observations sur le tridactyle panaché
 1860 – Altisides. Annales de la Société Linnéenne de Lyon (n.s.) 6: 137–384

French entomologists
1783 births
1859 deaths
Scientists from Lyon